Cyperus lancastriensis is a species of sedge that is native to eastern parts of the United States.

See also 
 List of Cyperus species

References 

lancastriensis
Plants described in 1867
Flora of Alabama
Flora of Arkansas
Flora of Delaware
Flora of Florida
Flora of Georgia (U.S. state)
Flora of Illinois
Flora of Kentucky
Flora of Maryland
Flora of Mississippi
Flora of Missouri
Flora of New Jersey
Flora of North Carolina
Flora of Ohio
Flora of Pennsylvania
Flora of South Carolina
Flora of Texas
Flora of Tennessee
Flora of Virginia
Flora of West Virginia
Flora without expected TNC conservation status